Richborough Castle Halt was a minor station on the Kent Coast Line. It opened in 1918 for military use. Public services began in 1933, lasting until 1939 when the halt was closed.

History
Richborough Castle Halt was originally built for military use. It opened on 29 June 1918. The halt had two platforms, one of which was equipped with a shelter. On 19 June 1933, it opened to public services. The halt was closed on 11 September 1939.

References
Citations

Sources

Sandwich, Kent
Railway stations in Great Britain opened in 1918
Railway stations in Great Britain closed in 1939
Disused railway stations in Kent
1918 establishments in England
1939 disestablishments in England
Former South Eastern Railway (UK) stations